Dockers is a 1999 British feature-length television drama produced for Channel 4 about the struggles of a small group of Liverpool dockers who were sacked and subsequently spent nearly 2 and a half years picketing during the Liverpool Dockers' Strike of 1995 to 1998.

Although the credited screenwriters for the drama were Liverpool screenwriter Jimmy McGovern and Scottish novelist Irvine Welsh the drama was largely written by sacked dock workers and previous union members under the supervision of the two screenwriters. This unusual writing method was considered an experiment in 'democratic television' and was documented in a separate channel 4 documentary, Writing the Wrongs.

Plot

Production

Filming
When choosing locations for the film, the Transport and General Workers' Union refused to allow filming to take place within their premises, with former dockers being removed from the building at one point when actor Robert Carlyle came to offer support in a scripting session.

Writing
A group of genuine dockers held regular workshops with the production team. Once a week for a period of 14 months, sacked dockers met with Jimmy McGovern and Irvine Welsh, who helped towards writing the script.

References

External links
Dockers at the British Film Institute
 

British television films
Channel 4 television films
1999 television specials
1999 television films
1999 films
Channel 4 television dramas
1990s English-language films